Mor Clemis Kuriakose, is the Metropolitan of Thrissur Diocese of Malankara Jacobite Syriac Orthodox Church. On August 24, 2008, Moran Mor Ignatius Zakka Iwas I Patriarch consecrated Metropolitan. Kuriakose Mor Clemis was appointed as the Metropolitan of Idukki Diocese. Since May, 2020 he is the Metropolitan of Thrissur Diocese. Mor Clemis Kuriakose Metropolitan is also the former President of St. Paul's Mission of India. On December 26, 2019, Ignatius Aphrem II Patriarch appointed Bishop Clemis Kuriakose as Metropolitan of Thrissur Diocese based on the synod of Malankara Jacobite Syriac Orthodox Church.

References

External links
 St. Paul's Mission Website

Living people
Syriac Orthodox Church bishops
Indian Oriental Orthodox Christians
Year of birth missing (living people)